Odostomia duureni is a species of sea snail, a marine gastropod mollusc in the family Pyramidellidae, the pyrams and their allies.

Description
The size of the shell varies between 1.8 mm and 2.5 mm

Distribution
This species occurs in the following locations:
 Azores Exclusive Economic Zone, found at a depth of 50 m.
 European waters (ERMS scope)

References

 Van Aartsen, J.J.; Gittenberger, E.; Goud, J. (1998). Pyramidellidae (Mollusca, Gastropoda, Heterobranchia) collected during the Dutch CANCAP and MAURITANIA expeditions in the south-eastern part of the North Atlantic Ocean (part 1) Zool. Verh. 321: 3-57

External links
 
 To CLEMAM
 To Encyclopedia of Life
 To World Register of Marine Species

duureni
Gastropods described in 1998
Molluscs of the Atlantic Ocean